Washington County Courthouse is a historic courthouse located at Plymouth, Washington County, North Carolina. It was designed by the architectural firm of Benton & Benton and built in 1918–1919.  It is a three-story, Classical Revival style brick building with heavy stone trim.  The front facade features a monumental tetrastyle Ionic order portico.

It was listed on the National Register of Historic Places in 1979.  It is located in the Plymouth Historic District.

References

County courthouses in North Carolina
Courthouses on the National Register of Historic Places in North Carolina
Neoclassical architecture in North Carolina
Government buildings completed in 1919
Buildings and structures in Washington County, North Carolina
National Register of Historic Places in Washington County, North Carolina
Historic district contributing properties in North Carolina
1919 establishments in North Carolina